This article covers opinion polling for the 2022 Philippine Senate election.

Opinion polling in Philippines is conducted by Social Weather Stations (SWS), Pulse Asia, OCTA Research, and other pollsters.

Those who win outright are in bold. Those that are within the margin of error are in italics.

Polling for senatorial elections 
Pollsters usually do face-to-face interviews on respondents. They sometimes present respondents with a mock ballot on which the respondent will mark his or her choices for the Senate. The Senate of the Philippines is elected via multiple non-transferable vote on an at-large basis, where a voter has 12 votes, cannot transfer any of the votes to a candidate, and can vote for up to twelve candidates. If the mock ballot has 13 or more preferences, the pollster classifies it as "invalid."

Pollsters, aside from publishing preferences per candidate, also include other data such as averages on how many candidates the respondents included on their preferences.

Calendar 

 Filing of candidacies: October 1 to 8, 2021
 Deadline in substituting a candidate for it to appear on the ballot: November 15, 2021
 Campaign period for nationally elected positions: February 8 to May 7, 2022
 Campaign period for locally elected positions: March 25 to May 7, 2022
 Election day: May 9, 2022

Survey details

Per candidate

By voter preferences

Graphical summary

February 2022—May 2022

October 2021–January 2022

Before October 2021 
This list includes all individuals named by at least 10% of respondents in any of the surveys.

By ranking 
The surveys done here were done after the campaign period has started on February 8, 2022.

Per party 
 Parties (excluding independents) with the plurality of seats in boldface.
 Parties (excluding independents) with the majority of seats are shaded by the party color.

Seats won 
 Totals may not add up to 12 due to margin of error.

Seats after the election 
Totals may not add up to 24 due to margin of error.

Per coalition 
Coalitions are expected to release 12-person slates for the election by the start of campaigning on February 8, 2022. On this section will be the surveys done after that day.

References 

2022 Philippine general election
Opinion polling in the Philippines